Ásta Kristjana Sveinsdóttir (born October 5, 1969), who publishes as Ásta, is an Icelandic philosopher. She was a professor of philosophy at San Francisco State University and is currently a professor at Duke University.

Born  in Reykjavík, Ásta has a BA in mathematics and philosophy from Brandeis University in 1992, AM in philosophy from Harvard University, 1997, and PhD in philosophy from the Massachusetts Institute of Technology, 2004. She was a host lecturer at Vassar College in New York in late 2004 and early 2005, and has taught at San Francisco State University since the autumn of 2005.

Ásta is predominantly concerned with metaphysics, the philosophy of language, epistemology, ethics, and aesthetics. She has authored papers on feminist metaphysics such as The Metaphysics of Sex and Gender.

Ásta's first book appeared in 2018, Categories We Live By, published by Oxford University Press.

See also
Hypatia transracialism controversy

References

1969 births
20th-century essayists
Ásta Kristjana Sveinsdóttir
Ásta Kristjana Sveinsdóttir
Ásta Kristjana Sveinsdóttir
21st-century essayists
Ásta Kristjana Sveinsdóttir
Ásta Kristjana Sveinsdóttir
Brandeis University alumni
Epistemologists
Ethicists
Harvard Graduate School of Arts and Sciences alumni
Asta Kristjana Sveinsdottir
Asta Kristjana Sveinsdottir
Living people
Metaphysicians
MIT School of Humanities, Arts, and Social Sciences alumni
Ontologists
Asta Kristjana Sveinsdottir
Philosophers of art
Philosophers of culture
Philosophers of language
Philosophers of sexuality
Philosophers of social science
Philosophy academics
San Francisco State University faculty
Social philosophers
Vassar College faculty
Ásta Kristjana Sveinsdóttir
Writers about activism and social change